Rasmus Fossum Tiller (born 28 July 1996) is a Norwegian cyclist, who currently rides for UCI ProTeam . In August 2019, he was named in the startlist for the 2019 Vuelta a España.

Major results

2016
 5th Road race, National Under-23 Road Championships
2017
 1st  Road race, National Road Championships
 3rd Kattekoers
 3rd Road race, National Under-23 Road Championships
 5th Grote Prijs Marcel Kint
2018
 1st Prologue Grand Prix Priessnitz spa
 2nd Road race, National Road Championships
 5th Tro-Bro Léon
2019
 4th Road race, National Road Championships
2021
 1st Dwars door het Hageland
 2nd Le Samyn
 2nd Binche–Chimay–Binche
 3rd Tour du Finistère
 5th Tro-Bro Léon
 5th Antwerp Port Epic
 6th Grand Prix de Wallonie
2022
 1st  Road race, National Road Championships
 2nd Binche–Chimay–Binche
 6th Omloop Het Nieuwsblad
 6th Nokere Koerse
 9th Le Samyn
 10th Dwars door het Hageland

Grand Tour general classification results timeline

References

External links

1996 births
Living people
Norwegian male cyclists
Sportspeople from Trondheim